Røyrvik is a municipality in Trøndelag county, Norway. It is part of the Namdalen region. The administrative centre of the municipality is the village of Røyrvik. The area has always had a strong Sami influence. The village lays relatively close to the border with Sweden and the municipal boundary eastwards forms part of the international border.

The  municipality is the 50th largest by area out of the 356 municipalities in Norway. Røyrvik is the 354th most populous municipality in Norway with a population of 441 making it the 3rd smallest municipal population in Norway.

General information
The municipality of Røyrvik was established on 1 July 1923 when it was separated from the municipality of Grong. Initially, the population was 392. The municipal boundaries have not since changed.  On 1 January 2018, the municipality switched from the old Nord-Trøndelag county to the new Trøndelag county.

Name
The municipality (originally the parish) is named after the old Røyrvik farm (historically: Røirviken) since the first Røyrvik Church was built there (in 1828).

Coat of arms
The coat of arms was granted on 13 December 1985. The official blazon is "Azure, a cross crosslet argent". This means the arms have a blue field (background) and the charge is a cross crosslet. The charge has a tincture of argent which means it is commonly colored white, but if it is made out of metal, then silver is used. This design is a common decoration on the pottery, hand-made articles, and traditional pewter embroidery found in the area. These objects were made by the ancestors of the Southern Sámi people presently living in the area. The crosses are a solar symbol indicating the four points of the compass. The arms were designed by Alfhild Vekterli and reworked by Einar H. Skjervold. The municipal flag has the same design as the coat of arms.

Churches
The Church of Norway has one parish within the municipality of Røyrvik. It is part of the Namdal prosti (deanery) in the Diocese of Nidaros.

Geography

The area is covered with many large lakes such as Limingen, the 9th largest in Norway. Other lakes include Jengelvatnet, Namsvatnet, Ovrejaevrie, Storgollomsvatnet, Tunnsjøen, and Tunnsjøflyan. The river Namsen begins in the lake Namsvatnet.

The mountainous areas also offer plentiful opportunities for outdoor activities.

Government
All municipalities in Norway, including Røyrvik, are responsible for primary education (through 10th grade), outpatient health services, senior citizen services, unemployment and other social services, zoning, economic development, and municipal roads. The municipality is governed by a municipal council of elected representatives, which in turn elect a mayor.  The municipality falls under the Trøndelag District Court and the Frostating Court of Appeal.

Municipal council
The municipal council of Røyrvik is made up of 11 representatives that are elected to four year terms. The party breakdown of the council is as follows:

Mayors
The mayors of Røyrvik:

1923–1934: Jens Ingvald Ornæs (V)
1935–1941: Petter Vekterli (KrF)
1942-1945: Harald Kleppestø (NS)
1945–1963: Petter Vekterli (KrF)
1964–1967: Kåre Hunnestad (KrF)
1968–1979: Petter Vekterli (KrF)
1980–1983: Johan Ole Vekterli (Sp)
1984–1985: Inge Staldvik (Ap)
1985–1987: Ragnar Ingulfsvann (Ap)
1988–1995: Magnar Namsvatn (KrF)
1995–2007: Marianne Ornæs (Sp)
2007–2011: Magnar Namsvatn (KrF)
2011–2015: Arnt Mickelsen (Ap)
2015–present: Hans Oskar Devik (Sp)

Economy
From 1911 until World War I, mining explorations were conducted in the Gjersvik areas. The modern Grong Gruber mines were active in the Joma area from 1972 until 1998. Farming and reindeer husbandry have always been a source of income in the area. The mining buildings now house various small industrial firms.

A few efforts to create new business include electronics assembly and electronic document management. A small alpine ski resort (Skisenteret) was started in 1986.

Notable people 
 Jan Myrheim (born 1948 in Røyrvik) a Norwegian physicist and academic
 Inge Staldvik (born 1955) a Norwegian politician, Mayor of Røyrvik 1983-1985

References

External links

Municipal fact sheet from Statistics Norway 
Tungmetaller renner rett ut i denne innsjøen 23 år etter at gruva stengte [Heavy metals flow straight into this lake, 23 years after the mine closed] (16 January 2021) NRK

 
Municipalities of Trøndelag
1923 establishments in Norway